Andalusia is the southernmost autonomous community in Peninsular Spain. It is the most populous and the second-largest autonomous community in the country. It is officially recognised as a "historical nationality". The territory is divided into eight provinces: Almería, Cádiz, Córdoba, Granada, Huelva, Jaén, Málaga, and Seville. Its capital city is Seville. The seat of the High Court of Justice of Andalusia is located in the city of Granada.

Andalusia is located in the south of the Iberian Peninsula, in southwestern Europe, immediately south of the autonomous communities of Extremadura and Castilla-La Mancha; west of the autonomous community of Murcia and the Mediterranean Sea; east of Portugal and the Atlantic Ocean; and north of the Mediterranean Sea and the Strait of Gibraltar. Andalusia is the only European region with both Mediterranean and Atlantic coastlines. Gibraltar shares a  land border with the Andalusian portion of the province of Cádiz at the eastern end of the Strait of Gibraltar.

The main mountain ranges of Andalusia are the Sierra Morena and the Baetic System, consisting of the Subbaetic and Penibaetic Mountains, separated by the Intrabaetic Basin. In the north, the Sierra Morena separates Andalusia from the plains of Extremadura and Castile–La Mancha on Spain's Meseta Central. To the south, the geographic subregion of  lies mostly within the Baetic System, while  is in the Baetic Depression of the valley of the Guadalquivir.

The name "Andalusia" is derived from the Arabic word Al-Andalus (الأندلس), which in turn may be derived from the Vandals, the Goths or pre-Roman Iberian tribes. The toponym al-Andalus is first attested by inscriptions on coins minted in 716 by the new Muslim government of Iberia. These coins, called dinars, were inscribed in both Latin and Arabic. The region's history and culture have been influenced by the Tartessians, Iberians, Phoenicians, Carthaginians, Greeks, Romans, Vandals, Visigoths, Byzantines, Berbers, Arabs, Jews, Romanis and Castilians. During the Islamic Golden Age, Córdoba surpassed Constantinople to be Europe's biggest city, and became the capital of Al-Andalus and a prominent center of education and learning in the world, producing numerous philosophers and scientists. The Castilian and other Christian North Iberian nationalities reconquered and settled the area in the latter phases of the Reconquista.

Andalusia has historically been an agricultural region, compared to the rest of Spain and the rest of Europe. Still, the growth of the community in the sectors of industry and services was above average in Spain and higher than many communities in the Eurozone. The region has a rich culture and a strong identity. Many cultural phenomena that are seen internationally as distinctively Spanish are largely or entirely Andalusian in origin. These include flamenco and, to a lesser extent, bullfighting and Hispano-Moorish architectural styles, both of which are also prevalent in some other regions of Spain.

Andalusia's hinterland is the hottest area of Europe, with cities like Córdoba and Seville averaging above  in summer high temperatures. These high temperatures, typical of the Guadalquivir valley (and other valleys in southern Iberia) are usually reached between 5 p.m. and 9 p.m. (local time), tempered by sea and mountain breezers afterwards. Seville also has the highest average annual temperature in mainland Spain and mainland Europe, closely followed by Almería.

Name

Its present form is derived from the Arabic name for Muslim Iberia, "Al-Andalus". The etymology of the name "Al-Andalus" is disputed, and the extent of Iberian territory encompassed by the name has changed over the centuries. The etymology of the name "al-Andalus" has traditionally been derived from the name of the Vandals. Since the 1980s, a number of proposals have challenged this contention. Halm, in 1989, derived the name from a Gothic term, *,
and in 2002, Bossong suggested its derivation from a pre-Roman substrate. 

The Spanish place name Andalucía (immediate source of the English Andalusia) was introduced into the Spanish languages in the 13th century under the form el Andalucía. The name was adopted to refer to those territories still under Moorish rule, and generally south of Castilla Nueva and Valencia, and corresponding with the former Roman province hitherto called Baetica in Latin sources. This was a Castilianization of Al-Andalusiya, the adjectival form of the Arabic language al-Andalus, the name given by the Arabs to all of the Iberian territories under Muslim rule from 711 to 1492. The etymology of al-Andalus is itself somewhat debated (see al-Andalus), but in fact it entered the Arabic language before this area came under Moorish rule.

Like the Arabic term al-Andalus, in historical contexts the Spanish term Andalucía or the English term Andalusia do not necessarily refer to the exact territory designated by these terms today. Initially, the term referred exclusively to territories under Muslim control. Later, it was applied to some of the last Iberian territories to be regained from the Muslims, though not always to exactly the same ones. In the Estoria de España (also known as the Primera Crónica General) of Alfonso X of Castile, written in the second half of the 13th century, the term Andalucía is used with three different meanings:

 As a literal translation of the Arabic al-Ándalus when Arabic texts are quoted.
 To designate the territories the Christians had regained by that time in the Guadalquivir valley and in the Kingdoms of Granada and Murcia. In a document from 1253, Alfonso X styled himself Rey de Castilla, León y de toda Andalucía ("King of Castile, León and all of Andalusia").
 To designate the territories the Christians had regained by that time in the Guadalquivir valley until that date (the Kingdoms of Jaén, Córdoba and Seville – the Kingdom of Granada was incorporated in 1492). This was the most common significance in the Late Middle Ages and Early modern period.

From an administrative point of view, Granada remained separate for many years even after the completion of the Reconquista due, above all, to its emblematic character as the last territory regained, and as the seat of the important Real Chancillería de Granada, a court of last resort. Still, the reconquest and repopulation of Granada was accomplished largely by people from the three preexisting Christian kingdoms of Andalusia, and Granada came to be considered a fourth kingdom of Andalusia. The often-used expression "Four Kingdoms of Andalusia" dates back in Spanish at least to the mid-18th century.

Symbols

The Andalusian emblem shows the figure of Hercules and two lions between the two pillars of Hercules that tradition situates on either side of the Strait of Gibraltar. An inscription below, superimposed on an image of the flag of Andalusia reads Andalucía por sí, para España y la Humanidad ("Andalusia for herself, Spain and Humanity"). Over the two columns is a semicircular arch in the colours of the flag of Andalusia, with the Latin words Dominator Hercules Fundator (Lord Hercules is the Founder) superimposed.

The official flag of Andalusia consists of three equal horizontal stripes, coloured green, white, and green respectively; the Andalusian coat of arms is superimposed on the central stripe. Its design was overseen by Blas Infante and approved in the Assembly of Ronda (a 1918 gathering of Andalusian nationalists at Ronda). Blas Infante considered these to have been the colours most used in regional symbols throughout the region's history. According to him, the green came in particular from the standard of the Umayyad Caliphate and represented the call for a gathering of the populace. The white symbolised pardon in the Almohad dynasty, interpreted in European heraldry as parliament or peace. Other writers have justified the colours differently, with some Andalusian nationalists referring to them as the Arbonaida, meaning white-and-green in Mozarabic, a Romance language that was spoken in the region in Muslim times. Nowadays, the Andalusian government states that the colours of the flag evoke the Andalusian landscape as well as values of purity and hope for the future.

The anthem of Andalusia was composed by José del Castillo Díaz (director of the Municipal Band of Seville, commonly known as Maestro Castillo) with lyrics by Blas Infante. The music was inspired by Santo Dios, a popular religious song sung at harvest time by peasants and day labourers in the provinces of Málaga, Seville, and Huelva. Blas Infante brought the song to Maestro Castillo's attention; Maestro Castillo adapted and harmonized the traditional melody. The lyrics appeal to the Andalusians to mobilise and demand tierra y libertad ("land and liberty") by way of agrarian reform and a statute of autonomy within Spain.

The Parliament of Andalusia voted unanimously in 1983 that the preamble to the Statute of Autonomy recognise Blas Infante as the Father of the Andalusian Nation (Padre de la Patria Andaluza), which was reaffirmed in the reformed Statute of Autonomy submitted to popular referendum 18 February 2007. The preamble of the present 2007 Statute of Autonomy says that Article 2 of the present Spanish Constitution of 1978 recognises Andalusia as a nationality. Later, in its articulation, it speaks of Andalusia as a "historic nationality" (Spanish: nacionalidad histórica). It also cites the 1919 Andalusianist Manifesto of Córdoba describing Andalusia as a "national reality" (realidad nacional), but does not endorse that formulation. Article 1 of the earlier 1981 Statute of Autonomy defined it simply as a "nationality" (nacionalidad).

The national holiday, Andalusia Day, is celebrated on 28 February, commemorating the 1980 autonomy referendum. In spite of this, nationalist groups celebrate the holiday on 4 December, commemorating the 1977 demonstrations to demand autonomy.

The honorific title of Hijo Predilecto de Andalucía ("Favourite Son of Andalucia") is granted by the Autonomous Government of Andalusia to those whose exceptional merits benefited Andalusia, for work or achievements in natural, social, or political science. It is the highest distinction given by the Autonomous Community of Andalusia.

Geography
The Sevillian historian Antonio Domínguez Ortiz wrote that:

Location
Andalusia alone is comparable in extent and in the variety of its terrain to any of several of the smaller European countries. To the east is the Mediterranean Sea; to the west Portugal and the Gulf of Cádiz (Atlantic Ocean); to the north the Sierra Morena constitutes the border with the Meseta Central; to the south, the self-governing British overseas territory of Gibraltar and the Strait of Gibraltar separate it from Morocco.

Climate

In the west, weather systems sweeping in from the Atlantic ensure that it is relatively wet and humid in the winter, with some areas receiving copious amounts. Contrary to what many people think, as a whole, the region enjoys above-average yearly rainfall in the context of Spain.

Andalusia sits at a latitude between 36° and 38° 44' N, in the warm-temperate region. In general, it experiences a hot-summer Mediterranean climate, with dry summers influenced by the Azores High, but subject to occasional torrential rains and extremely hot temperatures. In the winter, the tropical anticyclones move south, allowing cold polar fronts to penetrate the region. Still, within Andalusia there is considerable climatic variety. From the extensive coastal plains one may pass to the valley of the Guadalquivir, barely above sea level, then to the highest altitudes in the Iberian peninsula in the peaks of the Sierra Nevada. In a mere  one can pass from the subtropical coast of the province of Granada to the snowy peaks of Mulhacén. Andalusia also includes both the dry Tabernas Desert in the province of Almería and the Sierra de Grazalema Natural Park in the province of Cádiz, which experiences Spain's greatest rainfall.

Andalusia is also home to the driest place in continental Europe, the Cabo de Gata, with only  of rain per year.

In general, as one goes from west to east, away from the Atlantic, there is less precipitation. "Wet Andalusia" includes most of the highest points in the region, above all the Sierra de Grazalema but also the Serranía de Ronda in western Málaga. The valley of the Guadalquivir has moderate rainfall. The Tabernas Desert in Almería, Europe's only true desert, has less than 75 days with any measurable precipitation, and some particular places in the desert have as few as 50 such days. Much of "dry Andalusia" has more than 300 sunny days a year.

Córdoba is the hottest provincial capital, followed by Seville.

The Guadalquivir valley has experienced some of the highest temperatures recorded in Europe, with a maximum of  recorded at Córdoba (14 August 2021), and Seville. The mountains of Granada and Jaén have the coldest temperatures in southern Iberia, but do not reach continental extremes (and, indeed are surpassed by some mountains in northern Spain). Sierra Nevada Natural Park has Iberia's lowest average annual temperature, ( at Pradollano) and its peaks remain snowy practically year-round.

Terrain

Mountain ranges affect climate, the network of rivers, soils and their erosion, bioregions, and even human economies insofar as they rely on natural resources. The Andalusian terrain offers a range of altitudes and slopes. The picture is similar for areas under  (with the Baetic Depression), and for the variety of slopes.

The Atlantic coast is overwhelmingly beach and gradually sloping coasts; the Mediterranean coast has many cliffs, above all in the Malagan Axarquía and in Granada and Almería.

The Sierra Morena separates Andalusia from the plains of Extremadura and Castile–La Mancha on Spain's Meseta Central. Although sparsely populated, this is not a particularly high range, and its highest point, the  peak of La Bañuela in the Sierra Madrona, lies outside of Andalusia. Within the Sierra Morena, the gorge of Despeñaperros forms a natural frontier between Castile and Andalusia.

The Baetic Cordillera consists of the parallel mountain ranges of the Cordillera Penibética near the Mediterranean coast and the Cordillera Subbética inland, separated by the Surco Intrabético. The Cordillera Subbética is quite discontinuous, offering many passes that facilitate transportation, but the Penibético forms a strong barrier between the Mediterranean coast and the interior.

Lower Andalusia, the Baetic Depression, the basin of the Guadalquivir, lies between these two mountainous areas. It is a nearly flat territory, open to the Gulf of Cádiz in the southeast. Throughout history, this has been the most populous part of Andalusia.

Hydrography

Andalusia has rivers that flow into both the Atlantic and the Mediterranean. Flowing to the Atlantic are the Guadiana, Odiel-Tinto, Guadalquivir, Guadalete, and Barbate. Flowing to the Mediterranean are the Guadiaro, Guadalhorce, Guadalmedina, Guadalfeo, Andarax (also known as the Almería) and Almanzora.

The rivers of the Atlantic basin are characteristically long, run through mostly flat terrain, and have broad river valleys. As a result, at their mouths are estuaries and wetlands, such as the marshes of Doñana in the delta of the Guadalquivir, and wetlands of the Odiel. In contrast, the rivers of the Mediterranean Basin are shorter, more seasonal, and make a precipitous descent from the mountains of the Baetic Cordillera. Their estuaries are small, and their valleys are less suitable for agriculture. Also, being in the rain shadow of the Baetic Cordillera means that they receive a lesser volume of water.

The following hydrographic basins can be distinguished in Andalusia. On the Atlantic side are the Guadalquivir basin; the Andalusian Atlantic Basin with the sub-basins Guadalete-Barbate and Tinto-Odiel; and the Guadiana basin. On the Mediterranean side is the Andalusian Mediterranean Basin and the upper portion of the basin of the Segura.

Soils
The soils of Andalusia can be divided into three large areas: the Sierra Morena, Cordillera Subbética, and the Baetic Depression and the Surco Intrabético.

The Sierra Morena, due to its morphology and the acidic content of its rocks, developed principally relatively poor, shallow soils, suitable only for forests. In the valleys and in some areas where limestone is present, deeper soils allowed farming of cereals suitable for livestock. The more complicated morphology of the Baetic Cordillera makes it more heterogeneous, with the most heterogeneous soils in Andalusia. Very roughly, in contrast to the Sierra Morena, a predominance of basic (alkaline) materials in the Cordillera Subbética, combined with a hilly landscape, generates deeper soils with greater agricultural capacity, suitable to the cultivation of olives.

Finally, the Baetic Depression and the Surco Intrabético have deep, rich soils, with great agricultural capacity. In particular, the alluvial soils of the Guadalquivir valley and plain of Granada have a loamy texture and are particularly suitable for intensive irrigated crops. In the hilly areas of the countryside, there is a double dynamic: the depressions have filled with older lime-rich material, developing the deep, rich, dark clay soils the Spanish call bujeo, or tierras negras andaluzas, excellent for dryland farming. In other zones, the whiter albariza provides an excellent soil for vineyards.

Despite their marginal quality, the poorly consolidated soils of the sandy coastline of Huelva and Almería have been successfully used in recent decades for hothouse cultivation under clear plastic of strawberries, raspberries, blueberries, and other fruits.

Flora

Biogeographically, Andalusia forms part of the Western Mediterranean subregion of the Mediterranean Basin, which falls within the Boreal Kingdom. Five floristic provinces lie, in whole or in part, within Andalusia: along much of the Atlantic coast, the Lusitanian-Andalusian littoral or Andalusian Atlantic littoral; in the north, the southern portion of the Luso-Extremaduran floristic province; covering roughly half of the region, the Baetic floristic province; and in the extreme east, the Almerian portion of the Almerian-Murcian floristic province and (coinciding roughly with the upper Segura basin) a small portion of the Castilian-Maestrazgan-Manchegan floristic province. These names derive primarily from past or present political geography: "Luso" and "Lusitanian" from Lusitania, one of three Roman provinces in Iberia, most of the others from present-day Spanish provinces, and Maestrazgo being a historical region of northern Valencia.

In broad terms, the typical vegetation of Andalusia is Mediterranean woodland, characterized by leafy xerophilic perennials, adapted to the long, dry summers. The dominant species of the climax community is the holly oak (Quercus ilex). Also abundant are cork oak (Quercus suber), various pines, and Spanish fir (Abies pinsapo). Due to cultivation, olive (Olea europaea) and almond (Prunus dulcis) trees also abound. The dominant understory is composed of thorny and aromatic woody species, such as rosemary (Rosmarinus officinalis), thyme (Thymus), and Cistus. In the wettest areas with acidic soils, the most abundant species are the oak and cork oak, and the cultivated Eucalyptus. In the woodlands, leafy hardwoods of genus Populus (poplars, aspens, cottonwoods) and Ulmus (elms) are also abundant; poplars are cultivated in the plains of Granada.

The Andalusian woodlands have been much altered by human settlement, the use of nearly all of the best land for farming, and frequent wildfires. The degraded forests become shrubby and combustible garrigue. Extensive areas have been planted with non-climax trees such as pines. There is now a clear conservation policy for the remaining forests, which survive almost exclusively in the mountains.

Fauna

The biodiversity of Andalusia extends to its fauna as well. More than 400 of the 630 vertebrate species extant in Spain can be found in Andalusia. Spanning the Mediterranean and Atlantic basins, and adjacent to the Strait of Gibraltar, Andalusia is on the migratory route of many of the numerous flocks of birds that travel annually from Europe to Africa and back.

The Andalusian wetlands host a rich variety of birds. Some are of African origin, such as the red-knobbed coot (Fulica cristata), the purple swamphen (Porphyrio porphyrio), and the greater flamingo (Phoenicopterus roseus). Others originate in Northern Europe, such as the greylag goose (Anser anser). Birds of prey (raptors) include the Spanish imperial eagle (Aquila adalberti), the griffon vulture (Gyps fulvus), and both the black and red kite (Milvus migrans and Milvus milvus).

Among the herbivores, are several deer (Cervidae) species, notably the fallow deer (Dama dama) and roe deer (Capreolus capreolus); the European mouflon (Ovis aries musimon), a feral sheep; and the Spanish ibex (Capra pyrenaica, which despite its scientific name is no longer found in the Pyrenees). The Spanish ibex has recently been losing ground to the Barbary sheep (Ammotragus lervia), an invasive species from Africa, introduced for hunting in the 1970s. Among the small herbivores are rabbits—especially the European rabbit (Oryctolagus cuniculus)—which form the most important part of the diet of the carnivorous species of the Mediterranean woodlands.

The large carnivores such as the Iberian wolf (Canis lupus signatus) and the Iberian lynx (Lynx pardinus) are quite threatened, and are limited to the Sierra de Andújar, inside of Sierra Morena, Doñana and Despeñaperros. Stocks of the wild boar (Sus scrofa), on the other hand, have been well preserved because they are popular with hunters. More abundant and in varied situations of conservation are such smaller carnivores as otters, dogs, foxes, the European badger (Meles meles), the European polecat (Mustela putorius), the least weasel (Mustela nivalis), the European wildcat (Felis silvestris), the common genet (Genetta genetta), and the Egyptian mongoose (Herpestes ichneumon).

Other notable species are Acherontia atropos (a variety of death's-head hawkmoth), Vipera latasti (a venomous snake), and the endemic (and endangered) fish Aphanius baeticus.

Protected areas

Andalusia has many unique ecosystems. In order to preserve these areas in a manner compatible with both conservation and economic exploitation, many of the most representative ecosystems have been given protected status.

The various levels of protection are encompassed within the Network of Protected Natural Spaces of Andalusia (Red de Espacios Naturales Protegidos de Andalucía, RENPA) which integrates all protected natural spaces located in Andalusia, whether they are protected at the level of the local community, the autonomous community of Andalusia, the Spanish state, or by international conventions. RENPA consists of 150 protected spaces, consisting of two national parks, 24 natural parks, 21 periurban parks (on the fringes of cities or towns), 32 natural sites, two protected countrysides, 37 natural monuments, 28 nature reserves, and four concerted nature reserves (in which a government agency coordinates with the owner of the property for its management), all part of the European Union's Natura 2000 network. Under the international ambit are the nine Biosphere Reserves, 20 Ramsar wetland sites, four Specially Protected Areas of Mediterranean Importance and two UNESCO Geoparks.

In total, nearly 20 percent of the territory of Andalusia lies in one of these protected areas, which constitute roughly 30 percent of the protected territory of Spain. Among these many spaces, some of the most notable are the Sierras de Cazorla, Segura y Las Villas Natural Park, Spain's largest natural park and the second largest in Europe, the Sierra Nevada National Park, Doñana National Park and Natural Park, the Tabernas Desert, and the Cabo de Gata-Níjar Natural Park, the largest terrestrial-maritime reserve in the European Western Mediterranean Sea.

History

The geostrategic position of Andalusia in the extreme south of Europe, providing (along with Morocco) a gateway between Europe and Africa, added to its position between the Atlantic Ocean and the Mediterranean Sea, as well as its rich deposits of minerals and its agricultural wealth, have made Andalusia a tempting prize for civilizations since prehistoric times.

Several theories postulate that the first hominids in Europe were in Andalusia, having passed across the Strait of Gibraltar; the earliest known paintings of humanity have been found in the Caves of Nerja, Málaga. The first settlers, based on artifacts from the archaeological sites at Los Millares, El Argar, and Tartessos, were clearly influenced by cultures of the Eastern Mediterranean who arrived on the Andalusian coast. Andalusia then went through a period of protohistory, when the region did not have a written language of its own, but its existence was known to and documented by literate cultures, principally the Phoenicians and Ancient Greeks, wide historical moment in which Cádiz was founded, regarded by many as the oldest city still standing in Western Europe; another city among the oldest is Málaga. During the second millennium BCE, the kingdom of Tartessos developed in Andalusia.

Carthaginians and Romans

With the fall of the original Phoenician cities in the East, Carthage – itself the most significant Phoenician colony – became the dominant sea power of the western Mediterranean and the most important trading partner for the Phoenician towns along the Andalusian coast. Between the First and Second Punic Wars, Carthage extended its control beyond Andalucia to include all of Iberia except the Basque Country. Some of the more prominent Andalusian cities during Carthaginian rule include Gadir (Cadiz), Qart Juba (Córdoba), Ilipa (near modern Seville), Malaka (Málaga) and Sexi or Seksi (near modern Almuñécar). Andalusia was the major staging ground for the war with Rome led by the Carthaginian general Hannibal. The Romans defeated the Carthaginians and conquered Andalusia, the region being renamed Baetica. It was fully incorporated into the Roman Empire, and from this region came many Roman magistrates and senators, as well as the emperors Trajan and (most likely) Hadrian.

Vandals, Visigoths and the Byzantine Empire
The Vandals moved briefly through the region during the 5th century AD before settling in North Africa, after which the region fell into the hands of the Visigothic Kingdom. The Visigoths in this region were practically independent of the Visigothic Catholic Kingdom of Toledo. This is the era of Saints Isidore of Seville and Hermenegild. During this period, around 555 AD, the Eastern Roman Empire conquered Andalusia under Justinian I, the Eastern Roman emperor. They established Spania, a province of the Byzantine Empire from 552 until 624. Though their holdings were quickly reduced, they continued to have interests in the region until it was lost altogether in 624.

Al-Andalus states

The Visigothic era came to an abrupt end in 711 with the Umayyad conquest of Hispania by the Muslim Umayyad general Tariq ibn Ziyad. Tariq is known in Umayyad history and legend as a formidable conqueror who dared and bore the nerve to burn his fleet of ships, when he landed with his troops on the coast of Gibraltar – an acronym of "Jabel alTariq" meaning "the mountain of Tariq". When the Muslim invaders seized control and consolidated their dominion of the region, they remained tolerant of the local faiths, but they also needed a place for their own faith. In the 750s, they forcibly rented half of Córdoba 's Cathedral of San Vicente (Visigothic) to use as a mosque.

 The mosque's hypostyle plan, consisting of a rectangular prayer hall and an enclosed courtyard, followed a tradition established in the Umayyad and Abbasid mosques of Syria and Iraq while the dramatic articulation of the interior of the prayer hall was unprecedented.  The system of columns supporting double arcades of piers and arches with alternating red and white voussoirs is an unusual treatment that, structurally, combined striking visual effect with the practical advantage of providing greater height within the hall.  Alternating red and white voussoirs are associated with Umayyad monuments such as the Great Mosque of Damascus and the Dome of the Rock. Their use in the Great Mosque of Córdoba  manages to create a stunningly original visual composition even as it emphasises 'Abd al-Rahman's connection to the established Umayyad tradition.

In this period, the name "Al-Andalus" was applied to the Iberian Peninsula, and later it referred to the parts not controlled by the Gothic states in the North. The Muslim rulers in Al-Andalus were economic invaders and interested in collecting taxes; social changes imposed on the native populace were mainly confined to geographical, political and legal conveniences. Al-Andalus remained connected to other states under Muslim rule; also trade routes between it and Constantinople and Alexandria remained open, while many cultural features of the Roman Empire were transmitted throughout Europe and the Near East by its successor state, the Byzantine Empire. Byzantine architecture is an example of such cultural diffusion continuing even after the collapse of the empire.

Nevertheless, the Guadalquivir River valley became the point of power projection in the peninsula with the Caliphate of Córdoba making Córdoba  its capital. The Umayyad Caliphate produced such leaders as Caliph Abd-ar-Rahman III (ruled 912–961) and his son, Caliph Al-Hakam II (ruled 961–976) and built the magnificent Great Mosque of Córdoba . Under these rulers, Córdoba  was the center of economic and cultural significance.

By the 10th century, the northern Kingdoms of Spain and other European Crowns had begun what would eventually become the Reconquista: the reconquest of the Iberian Peninsula for Christendom. Caliph Abd-ar-Rahman suffered some minor military defeats, but often managed to manipulate the Gothic northern kingdoms to act against each other's interests. Al-Hakam achieved military successes, but at the expense of uniting the north against him. In the 10th century the Saracen rulers of Andalusia had a Slavic army of 13,750 men.

After the conquest of Toledo in 1086 by Alfonso VI, the Crown of Castille and the Crown of Aragon dominated large parts of the peninsula. The main Taifas therefore had to resort to assistance from various other powers across the Mediterranean. A number of different Muslim dynasties of North African origin—notably Almoravid dynasty and Almohad dynasty—dominated a slowly diminishing Al-Andalus over the next several centuries.

After the victory at the Battle of Sagrajas (1086) put a temporary stop to Castilian expansion, the Almoravid dynasty reunified Al-Andalus with its capital in Córdoba , ruling until the mid-12th century. The various Taifa kingdoms were assimilated. the Almohad dynasty expansion in North Africa weakened Al-Andalus, and in 1170 the Almohads transferred their capital from Marrakesh to Seville. The victory at the Battle of Las Navas de Tolosa (1212) marked the beginning of the end of the Almohad dynasty.

Crown of Castile
The weakness caused by the collapse of Almohad power and the subsequent creation of new Taifas, each with its own ruler, led to the rapid Castile reconquest of the valley of the Guadalquivir. Córdoba was regained in 1236 and Seville in 1248. The fall of Granada on 2 January 1492 put an end to the Nasrid rule; an event that marks the beginning of Andalusia, the southern four territories of the Crown of Castile in the Iberian Peninsula.

Seven months later, on 3 August 1492 Christopher Columbus left the town of Palos de la Frontera, Huelva, with the first expedition that resulted in the Discovery of the Americas, that would end the Middle Ages and signal the beginning of modernity. Many Castilians participated in this and other expeditions that followed, some of them known as the Minor or Andalusian Journeys.

Contacts between Spain and the Americas, including royal administration and the shipping trade from Asia and America for over three hundred years, came almost exclusively through the south of Spain, specially Seville and Cadiz ports.

As a result, it became the wealthiest, most influential region in Spain and amongst the most influential in Europe. For example, the Habsburg diverted much of this trade wealth to control its European territories.

Habsburg Spain
In the first half of the 16th century plague was still prevalent in Spain. According to George C. Kohn, "One of the worst epidemics of the century, whose miseries were accompanied by severe drought and food shortage, started in 1505; by 1507, about 100,000 people had died in Andalusia alone. Andalusia was struck once again in 1646. For three years, plague haunted the entire region, causing perhaps as many as 200,000 deaths, especially in Málaga and Seville."

A second insurrection, the Morisco Revolt (1568–1571), ensued in the Kingdom of Granada. It was crushed and the demographics of the kingdom of Granada was hammered, with the Morisco population decreasing in number by more than 100,000 including deaths, flights and deportations, contrasting with the less than 40,000 number of incoming settlers.

In 1810–12 Spanish troops strongly resisted the French occupation during the Peninsular War (part of the Napoleonic Wars).

Andalusia profited from the Spanish overseas empire, although much trade and finance eventually came to be controlled by other parts of Europe to where it was ultimately destined. In the 18th century, commerce from other parts of Spain began to displace Andalusian commerce when the Spanish government ended Andalusia's trading monopoly with the colonies in the Americas. The loss of the empire in the 1820s hurt the economy of the region, particularly the cities that had benefited from the trade and ship building. The construction of railways in the latter part of the 19th century enabled Andalusia to better develop its agricultural potential and it became an exporter of food. While industrialisation was taking off in the northern Spanish regions of Catalonia and the Basque country, Andalusia remained traditional and displayed a deep social division between a small class of wealthy landowners and a population made up largely of poor agricultural labourers and tradesmen.

Francoist oppressions

Andalusia was one of the worst affected regions of Spain by Francisco Franco's brutal campaign of mass-murder and political suppression called the White Terror during and after the Spanish Civil War. The Nationalist rebels bombed and seized the working-class districts of the main Andalusian cities in the first days of the war, and afterwards went on to execute thousands of workers and militants of the leftist parties: in the city of Córdoba  4,000; in the city of Granada 5,000; in the city of Seville 3,028; and in the city of Huelva 2,000 killed and 2,500 disappeared. The city of Málaga, occupied by the Nationalists in February 1937 following the Battle of Málaga, experienced one of the harshest repressions following Francoist victory with an estimated total of 17,000 people summarily executed. Carlos Arias Navarro, then a young lawyer who as public prosecutor signed thousands of execution warrants in the trials set up by the triumphant rightists, became known as "The Butcher of Málaga" (Carnicero de Málaga).

Paul Preston estimates the total number of victims of deliberately killed by the Nationalists in Andalusia at 55,000.

Government and politics

Andalusia is one of the 17 autonomous communities of Spain. The Regional Government of Andalusia (Spanish: Junta de Andalucía) includes the Parliament of Andalusia, its chosen president, a Consultative Council, and other bodies.

The Autonomous Community of Andalusia was formed in accord with a referendum of 28 February 1980 and became an autonomous community under the 1981 Statute of Autonomy known as the Estatuto de Carmona. The process followed the Spanish Constitution of 1978, still current as of 2009, which recognizes and guarantees the right of autonomy for the various regions and nationalities of Spain. The process to establish Andalusia as an autonomous region followed Article 151 of the Constitution, making Andalusia the only autonomous community to take that particular course. That article was set out for regions like Andalusia that had been prevented by the outbreak of the Spanish Civil War from adopting a statute of autonomy during the period of the Second Spanish Republic.

Article 1 of the 1981 Statute of Autonomy justifies autonomy based on the region's "historical identity, on the self-government that the Constitution permits every nationality, on outright equality to the rest of the nationalities and regions that compose Spain, and with a power that emanates from the Andalusian Constitution and people, reflected in its Statute of Autonomy".

In October 2006 the constitutional commission of the Cortes Generales (the national legislature of Spain), with favorable votes from the left-of-center Spanish Socialist Workers' Party (PSOE), the leftist United Left (IU) and the right-of-center People's Party (PP), approved a new Statute of Autonomy for Andalusia, whose preamble refers to the community as a "national reality" (realidad nacional):

On 2 November 2006 the Spanish Chamber Deputies ratified the text of the Constitutional Commission with 306 votes in favor, none opposed, and 2 abstentions. This was the first time a Spanish Organic Law adopting a Statute of Autonomy was approved with no opposing votes. The Senate, in a plenary session of 20 December 2006, ratified the referendum to be voted upon by the Andalusian public 18 February 2007.

The Statute of Autonomy spells out Andalusia's distinct institutions of government and administration. Chief among these is the Andalusian Autonomous Government (Junta de Andalucía). Other institutions specified in the Statute are the Defensor del Pueblo Andaluz (literally "Defender of the Andalusian People", basically an ombudsperson), the Consultative Council, the Chamber of Accounts, the Audiovisual Council of Andalusia, and the Economic and Social Council.

The Andalusian Statute of Autonomy recognizes Seville as the autonomy’s capital. The Andalusian Autonomous Government is located there. The region's highest court, the High Court of Andalusia (Tribunal Superior de Justicia de Andalucía) is not part of the Autonomous Government, and has its seat in Granada.

Autonomous Government

The Andalusian Autonomous Government (Junta de Andalucía) is the institution of self-government of the Autonomous Community of Andalusia. Within the government, the President of the Regional Government of Andalusia is the supreme representative of the autonomous community, and the ordinary representative of the Spanish state in the autonomous community. The president is formally named to the position by the Monarch of Spain and then confirmed by a majority vote of the Parliament of Andalusia. In practice, the monarch always names a person acceptable to the ruling party or coalition of parties in the autonomous region. In theory, were the candidate to fail to gain the needed majority, the monarch could propose a succession of candidates. After two months, if no proposed candidate could gain the parliament's approval, the parliament would automatically be dissolved and the acting president would call new elections. On 18 January 2019 Juan Manuel Moreno was elected as the sixth president of Andalusia.

The Council of Government, the highest political and administrative organ of the Community, exercises regulatory and executive power. The President presides over the council, which also includes the heads of various departments (Consejerías). In the current legislature (2008–2012), there are 15 of these departments. In order of precedence, they are Presidency, Governance, Economy and Treasury, Education, Justice and Public Administration, Innovation, Science and Business, Public Works and Transportation, Employment, Health, Agriculture and Fishing, Housing and Territorial Planning, Tourism, Commerce and Sports, Equality and Social Welfare, Culture, and Environment.

The Parliament of Andalusia, its Autonomic Legislative Assembly, develops and approves laws and elects and removes the President. Elections to the Andalusian Parliament follow a democratic formula through which the citizens elect 109 representatives. After the approval of the Statute of Autonomy through Organic Law 6/1981 on 20 December 1981, the first elections to the autonomic parliament took place 23 May 1982. Further elections have occurred in 1986, 1990, 1994, 1996, 2000, 2004, and 2008.

The current (2008–2012) legislature includes representatives of the PSOE-A (Andalusian branch of the left-of-center PSOE), PP-A (Andalusian branch of the right-of-center PP) and IULV-CA (Andalusian branch of the leftist IU).

Judicial power
The High Court of Andalusia (Tribunal Superior de Justicia de Andalucía) in Granada is subject only to the higher jurisdiction of the Supreme Court of Spain. The High Court is not an organ of the Autonomous Community, but rather of the Judiciary of Spain, which is unitary throughout the kingdom and whose powers are not transferred to the autonomous communities. The Andalusian territory is divided into 88 legal/judicial districts (partidos judiciales).

Administrative divisions

Provinces

Andalusia consists of eight provinces. The latter were established by Javier de Burgos in the 1833 territorial division of Spain. Each of the Andalusian provinces bears the same name as its capital:

Comarcas and mancomunidades

Within the various autonomous communities of Spain, comarcas are comparable to shires (or, in some countries, counties) in the English-speaking world. Unlike in some of Spain's other autonomous communities, under the original 1981 Statute of Autonomy, the comarcas of Andalusia had no formal recognition, but, in practice, they still had informal recognition as geographic, cultural, historical, or in some cases administrative entities. The 2007 Statute of Autonomy echoes this practice, and mentions comarcas in Article 97 of Title III, which defines the significance of comarcas and establishes a basis for formal recognition in future legislation.

The current statutory entity that most closely resembles a comarca is the mancomunidad, a freely chosen, bottom-up association of municipalities intended as an instrument of socioeconomic development and coordination between municipal governments in specific areas.

Municipalities and local entities

Beyond the level of provinces, Andalusia is further divided into 774 municipalities (municipios). The municipalities of Andalusia are regulated by Title III of the Statute of Autonomy, Articles 91–95, which establishes the municipality as the basic territorial entity of Andalusia, each of which has legal personhood and autonomy in many aspects of its internal affairs. At the municipal level, representation, government and administration is performed by the ayuntamiento (municipal government), which has competency for urban planning, community social services, supply and treatment of water, collection and treatment of waste, and promotion of tourism, culture, and sports, among other matters established by law.

Among the more important Andalusian cities besides the provincial capitals are:
 El Ejido, Níjar and Roquetas de Mar (Almería)
 La Línea de la Concepción, Algeciras, Sanlúcar de Barrameda, San Fernando, Chiclana de la Frontera, Puerto Real, Arcos de la Frontera, Jerez and El Puerto de Santa María (Cádiz)
 Lucena, Pozoblanco, Montilla and Puente Genil (Córdoba)
 Almuñécar, Guadix, Loja and Motril (Granada)
 Linares, Andújar, Úbeda and Baeza (Jaén)
 Marbella, Mijas, Vélez-Málaga, Fuengirola, Torremolinos, Estepona, Benalmádena, Antequera, Rincón de la Victoria and Ronda (Málaga)
 Utrera, Dos Hermanas, Alcalá de Guadaíra, Osuna, Mairena del Aljarafe, Écija and Lebrija (Sevilla)

In conformity with the intent to devolve control as locally as possible, in many cases, separate nuclei of population within municipal borders each administer their own interests. These are variously known as pedanías ("hamlets"), villas ("villages"), aldeas (also usually rendered as "villages"), or other similar names.

Main cities

Demographics
Andalusia ranks first by population among the 17 autonomous communities of Spain. The estimated population at the beginning of 2009 was 8,285,692. The population is concentrated, above all, in the provincial capitals and along the coasts, so that the level of urbanization is quite high; half the population is concentrated in the 28 cities of more than 50,000 inhabitants. The population is aging, although the process of immigration is countering the inversion of the population pyramid.

Population change

At the end of the 20th century, Andalusia was in the last phase of demographic transition. The death rate stagnated at around 8–9 per thousand, and the population came to be influenced mainly by birth and migration.
In 1950, Andalusia had 20.04 percent of the national population of Spain. By 1981, this had declined to 17.09 percent. Although the Andalusian population was not declining in absolute terms, these relative losses were due to emigration great enough to nearly counterbalance having the highest birth rate in Spain. Since the 1980s, this process has reversed on all counts, and as of 2009, Andalusia has 17.82 percent of the Spanish population.
The birth rate is sharply down, as is typical in developed economies, although it has lagged behind much of the rest of the world in this respect. Furthermore, prior emigrants have been returning to Andalusia. Beginning in the 1990s, others have been immigrating in large numbers as well, as Spain has become a country of net immigration.

At the beginning of the 21st century, statistics show a slight increase in the birth rate, due in large part to the higher birth rate among immigrants. The result is that as of 2009, the trend toward rejuvenation of the population is among the strongest of any autonomous community of Spain, or of any comparable region in Europe.

Structure

At the beginning of the 21st century, the population structure of Andalusia shows a clear inversion of the population pyramid, with the largest cohorts falling between ages 25 and 50. Comparison of the population pyramid in 2008 to that in 1986 shows:
 A clear decrease in the population under the age of 25, due to a declining birth rate.
 An increase in the adult population, as the earlier, larger cohort born in the "baby boom" of the 1960s and 1970s reach adulthood. This effect has been exacerbated by immigration: the largest contingent of immigrants are young adults.
 A further increase in the adult population, and especially the older adult population, due to increased life expectancy.

As far as composition by sex, two aspects stand out: the higher percentage of women in the elderly population, owing to women's longer life expectancy, and, on the other hand, the higher percentage of men of working age, due in large part to a predominantly male immigrant population.

Immigration
In 2005, 5.35 percent of the population of Andalusia were born outside of Spain. This is a relatively low number for a Spanish region, the national average being three percentage points higher. The immigrants are not evenly distributed among the Andalusian provinces: Almería, with a 15.20 percent immigrant population, is third among all provinces in Spain, while at the other extreme Jaén is only 2.07 percent immigrants and Córdoba 1.77 percent. The predominant nationalities among the immigrant populations are Moroccan (92,500, constituting 17.79 percent of the foreigners living in Andalusia) and British (15.25 percent across the region). When comparing world regions rather than individual countries, the single largest immigrant block is from the region of Latin America, outnumbering not only all North Africans, but also all non-Spanish Western Europeans. Demographically, this group has provided an important addition to the Andalusian labor force.

Economy

Andalusia is traditionally an agricultural area, but the service sector (particularly tourism, retail sales, and transportation) now predominates. The once booming construction sector, hit hard by the 2009 recession, was also important to the region's economy. The industrial sector is less developed than most other regions in Spain.

Between 2000 and 2006 economic growth per annum was 3.72%, one of the highest in the country. Still, according to the Spanish Instituto Nacional de Estadística (INE), the GDP per capita of Andalusia (€17,401; 2006) remains the second lowest in Spain, with only Extremadura lagging behind. The Gross domestic product (GDP) of the autonomous community was 160.6 billion euros in 2018, accounting for 13.4% of Spanish economic output. GDP per capita adjusted for purchasing power was 20,500 euros or 68% of the EU27 average in the same year.

Primary sector
The primary sector, despite adding the least of the three sectors to the regional GDP remains important, especially when compared to typical developed economies. The primary sector produces 8.26 percent of regional GDP, 6.4 percent of its GVA and employs 8.19 percent of the workforce. In monetary terms it could be considered a rather uncompetitive sector, given its level of productivity compared to other Spanish regions. In addition to its numeric importance relative to other regions, agriculture and other primary sector activities have strong roots in local culture and identity.

The primary sector is divided into a number of subsectors: agriculture, commercial fishing, animal husbandry, hunting, forestry, mining, and energy.

Agriculture, husbandry, hunting, and forestry

For many centuries, agriculture dominated Andalusian society, and, with 44.3 percent of its territory cultivated and 8.4 percent of its workforce in agriculture as of 2016 it remains an integral part of Andalusia's economy. However, its importance is declining, like the primary and secondary sectors generally, as the service sector is increasingly taking over. The primary cultivation is dryland farming of cereals and sunflowers without artificial irrigation, especially in the vast countryside of the Guadalquivir valley and the high plains of Granada and Almería-with a considerably lesser and more geographically focused cultivation of barley and oats. Using irrigation, maize, cotton and rice are also grown on the banks of the Guadalquivir and Genil.

The most important tree crops are olives, especially in the Subbetic regions of the provinces of Córdoba and Jáen, where irrigated olive orchards constitute a large component of agricultural output. There are extensive vineyards in various zones such as Jerez de la Frontera (sherry), Condado de Huelva, Montilla-Moriles and Málaga. Fruits—mainly citrus fruits—are grown near the banks of the Guadalquivir; almonds, which require far less water, are grown on the high plains of Granada and Almería.

In monetary terms, by far the most productive and competitive agriculture in Andalusia is the intensive forced cultivation of strawberries, raspberries, blueberries, and other fruits grown under hothouse conditions under clear plastic, often in sandy zones, on the coasts, in Almería and Huelva.

Organic farming has recently undergone rapid expansion in Andalusia, mainly for export to European markets but with increasing demand developing in Spain.

Andalusia has a long tradition of animal husbandry and livestock farming, but it is now restricted mainly to mountain meadows, where there is less pressure from other potential uses. Andalusians have a long and colourful history of dog breeding that can be observed throughout the region today. The raising of livestock now plays a semi-marginal role in the Andalusian economy, constituting only 15 percent of the primary sector, half the number for Spain taken as a whole.

"Extensive" raising of livestock grazes the animals on natural or cultivated pastures, whereas "intensive" raising of livestock is based in fodder rather than pasture. Although the productivity is higher than with extensive techniques, the economics are quite different. While intensive techniques now dominate in Europe and even in other regions of Spain, most of Andalusia's cattle, virtually all of its sheep and goats, and a good portion of its pigs are raised by extensive farming in mountain pastures. This includes the Black Iberian pigs that are the source of Jamón ibérico. Andalusia's native sheep and goats present a great economic opportunity in a Europe where animal products are generally in strong supply, but the sheep and goat meat, milk, and leather (and the products derived from these) are relatively scarce. Dogs are bred not just as companion animals, but also as herding animals used by goat and sheep herders.

Hunting remains relatively important in Andalusia, but has largely lost its character as a means of obtaining food.
It is now more of a leisure activity linked to the mountain areas and complementary to forestry and the raising of livestock. Dogs are frequently used as hunting companions to retrieve killed game.

The Andalusian forests are important for their extent—50 percent of the territory of Andalusia—and for other less quantifiable environmental reasons, such as their value in preventing erosion, regulating the flow of water necessary for other flora and fauna. For these reasons, there is legislation in place to protect the Andalusian forests. The value of forest products as such constitutes only 2 percent of agricultural production. This comes mostly from cultivated species—eucalyptus in Huelva and poplar in Granada—as well as naturally occurring cork oak in the Sierra Morena.

Fishing

Fishing is a longstanding tradition on the Andalusian coasts. Fish and other seafood have long figured prominently in the local diet and in the local gastronomic culture: fried fish (pescaito frito in local dialect), white prawns, almadraba tuna, among others. The Andalusian fishing fleet is Spain's second largest, after Galicia, and Andalusia's 38 fishing ports are the most of any Spanish autonomous community. Commercial fishing produces only 0.5 percent of the product of the regional primary sector by value, but there are areas where it has far greater importance. In the province of Huelva it constitutes 20 percent of the primary sector, and locally in Punta Umbría 70 percent of the work force is involved in commercial fishing.

Failure to comply with fisheries laws regarding the use of trawling, urban pollution of the seacoast, destruction of habitats by coastal construction (for example, alteration of the mouths of rivers, construction of ports), and diminution of fisheries by overexploitation
have created a permanent crisis in the Andalusian fisheries, justifying attempts to convert the fishing fleet. The decrease in fish stocks has led to the rise of aquaculture, including fish farming both on the coasts and in the interior.

Mining

Despite the general poor returns in recent years, mining retains a certain importance in Andalusia. Andalusia produces half of Spain's mining product by value. Of Andalusia's production, roughly half comes from the province of Huelva. Mining for precious metals at Minas de Riotinto in Huelva (see Rio Tinto Group) dates back to pre-Roman times; the mines were abandoned in the Middle Ages and rediscovered in 1556. Other mining activity is coal mining in the Guadiato valley in the province of Córdoba; various metals at Aznalcóllar in the province of Seville, and iron at Alquife in the province of Granada. In addition, limestone, clay, and other materials used in construction are well distributed throughout Andalusia.

Secondary sector: industry
The Andalusian industrial sector has always been relatively small. Nevertheless, in 2007, Andalusian industry earned 11.979 million euros and employed more than 290,000 workers. This represented 9.15 percent of regional GDP, far below the 15.08 the secondary sector represents in the economy of Spain as a whole. By analyzing the different subsectors of the food industry Andalusian industry accounts for more than 16% of total production. In a comparison with the Spanish economy, this subsector is virtually the only food that has some weight in the national economy with 16.16%. Lies far behind the manufacturing sector of shipping materials just over 10% of the Spanish economy. Companies like Cruzcampo (Heineken Group), Puleva, Domecq, Santana Motors or Renault-Andalusia, are exponents of these two subsectors. Of note is the Andalusian aeronautical sector, which is second nationally only behind Madrid and represents approximately 21% of total turnover in terms of employment, highlighting companies like Airbus, Airbus Military, or the newly formed Aerospace Alestis. On the contrary it is symptomatic of how little weight the regional economy in such important sectors such as textiles or electronics at the national level.

Andalusian industry is also characterized by a specialization in industrial activities of transforming raw agricultural and mineral materials. This is largely done by small enterprises without the public or foreign investment more typical of a high level of industrialization.

Tertiary sector: services

In recent decades the Andalusian tertiary (service) sector has grown greatly, and has come to constitute the majority of the regional economy, as is typical of contemporary economies in developed nations. In 1975 the service sector produced 51.1 percent of local GDP and employed 40.8 percent of the work force. In 2007, this had risen to 67.9 percent of GDP and 66.42 percent of jobs. This process of "tertiarization" of the economy has followed a somewhat unusual course in Andalusia. This growth occurred somewhat earlier than in most developed economies and occurred independently of the local industrial sector. There were two principal reasons that "tertiarization" followed a different course in Andalusia than elsewhere:

1. Andalusian capital found it impossible to compete in the industrial sector against more developed regions, and was obligated to invest in sectors that were easier to enter.

2. The absence of an industrial sector that could absorb displaced agricultural workers and artisans led to the proliferation of services with rather low productivity. This unequal development compared to other regions led to a hypertrophied and unproductive service sector, which has tended to reinforce underdevelopment, because it has not led to large accumulations of capital.

Tourism in Andalusia

Due in part to the relatively mild winter and spring climate, the south of Spain is attractive to overseas visitors–especially tourists from Northern Europe. While inland areas such as Jaén, Córdoba and the hill villages and towns remain relatively untouched by tourism, the coastal areas of Andalusia have heavy visitor traffic for much of the year.

Among the autonomous communities, Andalusia is second only to Catalonia in tourism, with nearly 30 million visitors every year. The principal tourist destinations in Andalusia are the Costa del Sol and (secondarily) the Sierra Nevada. As discussed above, Andalusia is one of the sunniest and warmest places in Europe, making it a center of "sun and sand" tourism, but not only it. Around 70 percent of the lodging capacity and 75 percent of the nights booked in Andalusian hotels are in coastal municipalities. The largest number of tourists come in August—13.26 percent of the nights booked throughout the year—and the smallest number in December—5.36 percent.

On the west (Atlantic) coast are the Costa de la Luz (provinces of Huelva and Cádiz), and on the east (Mediterranean) coast, the Costa del Sol (provinces of Cádiz y Málaga), Costa Tropical (Granada and part of Almería) and the Costa de Almería. In 2004, the Blue Flag beach program of the non-profit Foundation for Environmental Education recognized 66 Andalusian beaches and 18 pleasure craft ports as being in a good state of conservation in terms of sustainability, accessibility, and quality. Nonetheless, the level of tourism on the Andalusian coasts has been high enough to have a significant environmental impact, and other organizations—such as the Spanish Ecologists in Action (Ecologistas en Acción) with their description of "Black Flag beaches" or Greenpeace—have expressed the opposite sentiment. Still, Hotel chains such as Fuerte Hotels have ensured that sustainability within the tourism industry is one of their highest priorities.

Together with "sand and sun" tourism, there has also been a strong increase in nature tourism in the interior, as well as cultural tourism, sport tourism, and conventions. One example of sport and nature tourism is the ski resort at Sierra Nevada National Park.

As for cultural tourism, there are hundreds of cultural tourist destinations: cathedrals, castles, forts, monasteries, and historic city centers and a wide variety of museums.

It can be highlighted that Spain has seven of its 42 cultural UNESCO World Heritage Sites in Andalucia:
 Alhambra, Generalife and Albayzín, Granada (1984,1994)
 Antequera Dolmens Site (2016)
 10th Century Caliphate City of Medina Azahara (2018)
 Cathedral, Alcázar and Archivo de Indias in Seville (1987)
 Historic Centre of Córdoba  (1984,1994)
 Renaissance Monumental Ensembles of Úbeda and Baeza (2003)
 Rock Art of the Mediterranean Basin on the Iberian Peninsula (1998)

Further, there are the Lugares colombinos, significant places in the life of Christopher Columbus: Palos de la Frontera, La Rábida Monastery, and Moguer) in the province of Huelva. There are also archeological sites of great interest: the Roman city of Italica, birthplace of Emperor Trajan and (most likely) Hadrian or Baelo Claudia near Tarifa.

Andalusia was the birthplace of such great painters as Velázquez and Murillo (Seville) and, more recently, Picasso (Málaga); Picasso is memorialized by his native city at the Museo Picasso Málaga and Natal House Foundation; the Casa de Murillo was a house museum 1982–1998, but is now mostly offices for the Andalusian Council of Culture. The CAC Málaga (Museum of Modern Art)  is the most visited museum of Andalusia and has offered exhibitions of artists such as Louise Bourgeois, Jake and Dinos Chapman, Gerhard Richter, Anish Kapoor, Ron Mueck or Rodney Graham. Malaga is also located part of the private Carmen Thyssen-Bornemisza Collection at Carmen Thyssen Museum.

There are numerous other significant museums around the region, both of paintings and of archeological artifacts such as gold jewelry, pottery and other ceramics, and other works that demonstrate the region's artisanal traditions.

The Council of Government has designated the following "Municipios Turísticos": in Almería, Roquetas de Mar; in Cádiz, Chiclana de la Frontera, Chipiona, Conil de la Frontera, Grazalema, Rota, and Tarifa; in Granada, Almuñécar; in Huelva, Aracena; in Jaén, Cazorla; in Málaga, Benalmádena, Fuengirola, Nerja, Rincón de la Victoria, Ronda, and Torremolinos; in Seville, Santiponce.

Monuments and features

 Alcazaba, Almería
 Cueva de Menga, Antequera (Málaga)
 El Torcal, Antequera (Málaga)
 Medina Azahara, Córdoba
 Mosque, Córdoba
 Mudejar Quarter, Frigiliana (Málaga)
 Alhambra, Granada
 Palace of Charles V, Granada
 Charterhouse, Granada
 Albayzín, Granada
 La Rabida Monastery, Palos de la Frontera (Huelva)
 Castle of Santa Catalina, Jaén
 Jaén Cathedral, Jaén
 Úbeda and Baeza, Jaén
 Alcazaba, Málaga
 Buenavista Palace, Málaga
 Málaga Cathedral, Málaga
 Puente Nuevo, Ronda (Málaga)
 Caves of Nerja, Nerja (Málaga)
 Ronda Bullring, Ronda (Málaga)
 Giralda, Seville
 Torre del Oro, Seville
 Plaza de España, Seville
 Seville Cathedral, Seville
 Alcázar of Seville, Seville

Unemployment 
The unemployment rate stood at 25.5% in 2017 and was one of the highest in Spain and Europe.

Infrastructure

Transport

As in any modern society, transport systems are an essential structural element of the functioning of Andalusia. The transportation network facilitates territorial coordination, economic development and distribution, and intercity transportation.

In urban transport, underdeveloped public transport systems put pedestrian traffic and other non-motorized traffic are at a disadvantage compared to the use of private vehicles. Several Andalusian capitals—Córdoba, Granada and Seville—have recently been trying to remedy this by strengthening their public transport systems and providing a better infrastructure for the use of bicycles. There are now three rapid transit systems operating in Andalucia – the Seville Metro, Málaga Metro and Granada Metro. Cercanías commuter rail networks operate in Seville, Málaga and Cádiz.

For over a century, the conventional rail network has been centralized on the regional capital, Seville, and the national capital, Madrid; in general, there are no direct connections between provincial capitals. High-speed AVE trains run from Madrid via Córdoba to Seville and Málaga, from which a branch from Antequera to Granada opened in 2019. Further AVE routes are under construction. The Madrid-Córdoba-Seville route was the first high-velocity route in Spain (operating since 1992). Other principal routes are the one from Algeciras to Seville and from Almería via Granada to Madrid.

Most of the principal roads have been converted into limited access highways known as autovías. The Autovía del Este (Autovía A-4) runs from Madrid through the Despeñaperros Natural Park, then via Bailén, Córdoba, and Seville to Cádiz, and is part of European route E05 in the International E-road network. The other main road in the region is the portion of European route E15, which runs as the Autovia del Mediterráneo along the Spanish Mediterranean coast. Parts of this constitute the superhighway Autopista AP-7, while in other areas it is Autovía A-7. Both of these roads run generally east–west, although the Autovía A-4 turns to the south in western Andalusia.

Other first-order roads include the Autovía A-48 roughly along the Atlantic coast from Cádiz to Algeciras, continuing European route E05 to meet up with European route E15; the Autovía del Quinto Centenario (Autovía A-49), which continues west from Seville (where the Autovía A-4 turns toward the south) and goes on to Huelva and into Portugal as European route E01; the Autovía Ruta de la Plata (Autovía A-66), European route E803, which roughly corresponds to the ancient Roman 'Silver Route' from the mines of northern Spain, and runs north from Seville; the Autovía de Málaga (Autovía A-45), which runs south from Córdoba to Málaga; and the Autovía de Sierra Nevada (Autovía A-44), part of European route E902, which runs south from Jaén to the Mediterranean coast at Motril.

As of 2008 Andalusia has six public airports, all of which can legally handle international flights. The Málaga Airport is dominant, handling 60.67 percent of passengers and 85 percent of its international traffic. The Seville Airport handles another 20.12 percent of traffic, and the Jerez Airport 7.17 percent, so that these three airports account for 87.96 percent of traffic.

Málaga Airport is the international airport that offers a wide variety of international destinations. It has a daily link with twenty cities in Spain and over a hundred cities in Europe (mainly in Great Britain, Central Europe and the Nordic countries but also the main cities of Eastern Europe: Moscow, Saint Petersburg, Sofia, Riga or Bucharest), North Africa, Middle East (Riyadh, Jeddah and Kuwait) and North America (New York, Toronto and Montreal).

The main ports are Algeciras (for freight and container traffic) and Málaga for cruise ships. Seville has Spain's only commercial river port. Other significant commercial ports in Andalusia are the ports of the Bay of Cádiz, Almería and Huelva.

The Council of Government has approved a Plan of Infrastructures for the Sustainability of Transport in Andalusia (PISTA) 2007–2013, which plans an investment of 30 billion euros during that period.

Energy infrastructure

The lack of high-quality fossil fuels in Andalusia has led to a strong dependency on petroleum imports. Still, Andalusia has a strong potential for the development of renewable energy, above all wind energy. The Andalusian Energy Agency established in 2005 by the autonomous government, is a new governmental organ charged with the development of energy policy and provision of a sufficient supply of energy for the community.

The infrastructure for production of electricity consists of eight large thermal power stations, more than 70 hydroelectric power plants, two wind farms, and 14 major cogeneration facilities. Historically, the largest Andalusian business in this sector was the Compañía Sevillana de Electricidad, founded in 1894, absorbed into Endesa in 1996.
The Solar power tower PS10 was built by the Andalusian firm Abengoa in Sanlúcar la Mayor in the province of Seville, and began operating in March 2007. It is the largest existing solar power facility in Europe. Smaller solar power stations, also recent, exist at Cúllar and Galera, Granada, inaugurated by Geosol and Caja Granada. Two more large thermosolar facilities, Andasol I y II, planned at Hoya de Guadix in the province of Granada are expected to supply electricity to half a million households. The Plataforma Solar de Almería (PSA) in the Tabernas Desert is an important center for the exploration of the solar energy.

The largest wind power firm in the region is the Sociedad Eólica de Andalucía, formed by the merger of Planta Eólica del Sur S.A. and Energía Eólica del Estrecho S.A.

The Medgaz gas pipeline directly connects the Algerian town of Béni Saf to Almería.

Education

As throughout Spain, basic education in Andalusia is free and compulsory. Students are required to complete ten years of schooling, and may not leave school before the age of 16, after which students may continue on to a baccalaureate, to intermediate vocational education, to intermediate-level schooling in arts and design, to intermediate sports studies, or to the working world.

Andalusia has a tradition of higher education dating back to the Modern Age and the University of Granada, University of Baeza, and University of Osuna.

 there were ten private or public universities in Andalusia. University studies are structured in cycles, awarding degrees based on ECTS credits in accord with the Bologna process, which the Andalusian universities are adopting in accord with the other universities of the European Higher Education Area.

Healthcare

Responsibility for healthcare jurisdictions devolved from the Spanish government to Andalusia with the enactment of the Statute of Autonomy. Thus, the Andalusian Health Service (Servicio Andaluz de Salud) currently manages almost all public health resources of the Community, with such exceptions as health resources for prisoners and members of the military, which remain under central administration.

Science and technology
According to the Outreach Program for Science in Andalusia, Andalusia contributes 14 percent of Spain's scientific production behind only Madrid and Catalonia among the autonomous communities, even though regional investment in research and development (R&D) as a proportion of GDP is below the national average. The lack of research capacity in business and the low participation of the private sector in research has resulted in R&D taking place largely in the public sector.

The Council of Innovation, Science and Business is the organ of the autonomous government responsible for universities, research, technological development, industry, and energy. The council coordinates and initiates scientific and technical innovation through specialized centers an initiatives such as the Andalusian Center for Marine Science and Technology (Centro Andaluz de Ciencia y Tecnología Marina) and Technological Corporation of Andalusia (Corporación Tecnológica de Andalucía).

Within the private sphere, although also promoted by public administration, technology parks have been established throughout the Community, such as the Technological Park of Andalucia (Parque Tecnológico de Andalucía) in Campanillas on the outskirts of Málaga, and Cartuja 93 in Seville. Some of these parks specialize in specific sector, such as Aerópolis in aerospace or Geolit in food technology. The Andalusian government deployed 600,000 Ubuntu desktop computers in their schools.

Media
Andalusia has international, national, regional, and local media organizations, which are active gathering and disseminating information (as well as creating and disseminating entertainment).

The most notable is the public Radio y Televisión de Andalucía (RTVA), broadcasting on two regional television channels, Canal Sur and Canal Sur 2, four regional radio stations, Canal Sur Radio, Canal Fiesta Radio, Radio Andalucía Información and Canal Flamenco Radio, as well as various digital signals, most notably Canal Sur Andalucía available on cable TV throughout Spain.

Newspapers
Different newspapers are published for each Andalusian provincial capital, comarca, or important city. Often, the same newspaper organization publishes different local editions with much shared content, with different mastheads and different local coverage. There are also popular papers distributed without charge, again typically with local editions that share much of their content.

No single Andalusian newspaper is distributed throughout the region, not even with local editions. In eastern Andalusia the Diario Ideal has editions tailored for the provinces of Almería, Granada, and Jaén. Grupo Joly is based in Andalucia, backed by Andalusian capital, and publishes eight daily newspapers there. Efforts to create a newspaper for the entire autonomous region have not succeeded (the most recent as of 2009 was the Diario de Andalucía). The national press (El País, El Mundo, ABC, etc.) include sections or editions specific to Andalusia.

Public television

Andalusia has two public television stations, both operated by Radio y Televisión de Andalucía (RTVA):
 Canal Sur first broadcast on 28 February 1989 (Andalusia Day).
 Canal Sur 2 first broadcast 5 June 1998. Programming focuses on culture, sports, and programs for children and youth.

In addition, RTVA also operates the national and international cable channel Canal Sur Andalucía, which first broadcast in 1996 as Andalucía Televisión.

Radio
There are four public radio stations in the region, all operated by RTVA:
 Canal Sur Radio, first broadcast October 1988.
 Radio Andalucía Información, first broadcast September 1998.
 Canal Fiesta Radio, first broadcast January 2001.
 Canal Flamenco Radio, first broadcast 29 September 2008.

Art and culture

The patrimony of Andalusia has been shaped by its particular history and geography, as well as its complex flows of population. Andalusia has been home to a succession of peoples and civilizations, many very different from one another, each impacting the settled inhabitants. The ancient Iberians were followed by Celts, Phoenicians and other Eastern Mediterranean traders, Romans, migrating Germanic tribes, Arabs or Berbers. All have shaped the Spanish patrimony in Andalusia, which was already diffused widely in the literary and pictorial genre of the costumbrismo andaluz.

In the 19th century, Andalusian culture came to be widely viewed as the Spanish culture par excellence, in part thanks to the perceptions of romantic travellers. In the words of Ortega y Gasset:

Arts

Andalusia has been the birthplace of many great artists: the classic painters Velázquez, Murillo, and Juan de Valdés Leal; the sculptors Juan Martínez Montañés, Alonso Cano and Pedro de Mena; and such modern painters as Daniel Vázquez Díaz and Pablo Picasso.

The Spanish composer Manuel de Falla was from Cádiz and incorporated typical Andalusian melodies in his works, as did Joaquín Turina, from Seville. The great singer Camarón de la Isla was born in San Fernando, Cádiz, and Andrés Segovia who helped shape the romantic-modernist approach to classical guitar, was born in Linares, Jaén. The virtuoso Flamenco guitar player Paco de Lucia who helped internationalize Flamenco, was born in Algeciras, Cadiz.

Architecture

Since the Neolithic era, Andalusia has preserved important megaliths, such as the dolmens at the Cueva de Menga and the Dolmen de Viera, both at Antequera. Archeologists have found Bronze Age cities at Los Millares and El Argar. Archeological digs at Doña Blanca in El Puerto de Santa María have revealed the oldest Phoenicians city in the Iberian peninsula; major ruins have also been revealed at Roman Italica near Seville.

Some of the greatest architecture in Andalusia was  developed across several centuries and civilizations, and the region is particularly famous for its Islamic and Moorish architecture, which includes the Alhambra complex and the Mosque-Cathedral of Córdoba. 

The traditional architecture of Andalusia retains its Roman with Arab influences brought by Muslims, with a marked Mediterranean character strongly conditioned by the climate. Traditional urban houses are constructed with shared walls to minimize exposure to high exterior temperatures. Solid exterior walls are painted with lime to minimize the heating effects of the sun. In accord with the climate and tradition of each area, the roofs may be terraces or tiled in the Roman imbrex and tegula style. One of the most characteristic elements (and one of the most obviously influenced by Roman architecture) is the interior patio or courtyard; the patios of Córdoba are particularly famous. Other characteristic elements are decorative (and functional) wrought iron gratings and the tiles known as azulejos. Landscaping—both for common private homes and homes on a more lavish scale—also carries on older traditions, with plants, flowers, and fountains, pools, and streams of water. Beyond these general elements, there are also specific local architectural styles, such as the flat roofs, roofed chimneys, and radically extended balconies of the Alpujarra, the cave dwellings of Guadix and of Granada's Sacromonte, or the traditional architecture of the Marquisate of Zenete.

The monumental architecture of the centuries immediately after the Reconquista often displayed an assertion of Christian hegemony through architecture that referenced non-Arab influences. Some of the greatest Renaissance buildings in Andalusia are from the then-kingdom of Jaén: the Jaén Cathedral, designed in part by Andrés de Vandelvira, served as a model for the Cathedral of Malaga and Guadix; the centers of Úbeda and Baeza, dating largely from this era, are UNESCO World Heritage Sites. Seville and its kingdom also figured prominently in this era, as is shown by the Casa consistorial de Sevilla, the Hospital de las Cinco Llagas, or the Charterhouse of Jerez de la Frontera. The Palace of Charles V in Granada is uniquely important for its Italianate purism. Andalusia also has such Baroque-era buildings as the Palace of San Telmo in Seville (seat of the current autonomic presidency), the Church of Our Lady of Reposo in Campillos, and the Granada Charterhouse. Academicism gave the region the Royal Tobacco Factory in Seville and Neoclassicism the nucleus of Cádiz, such as its city hall, Royal Prison, and the Oratorio de la Santa Cueva.

Revivalist architecture in the 19th and 20th centuries contributed the buildings of the Ibero-American Exposition of 1929 in Seville, including the Neo-Mudéjar Plaza de España. Andalusia also preserves an important industrial patrimony related to various economic activities.

Besides the architecture of the cities, there is also much outstanding rural architecture: houses, as well as ranch and farm buildings and dog houses.

Sculpture

The Iberian reliefs of Osuna, Lady of Baza, and León de Bujalance, the Phoenician sarcophagi of Cádiz, and the Roman sculptures of the Baetic cities such as Italica give evidence of traditions of sculpture in Andalusia dating back to antiquity. There are few significant surviving sculptures from the time of al-Andalus; two notable exceptions are the lions of the Alhambra and of the Maristán of Granada (the Nasrid hospital in the Albaicín).

The Sevillian school of sculpture dating from the 13th century onward and the Granadan school beginning toward the end of the 16th century both focused primarily on Christian religious subject matter, including many wooden altarpieces. Notable sculptors in these traditions include Lorenzo Mercadante de Bretaña, Pedro Millán, Juan Martínez Montañés, Pedro Roldán, José de Arce, Jerónimo Balbás, Alonso Cano, and Pedro de Mena.

Non-religious sculpture has also existed in Andalusia since antiquity. A fine example from the Renaissance era is the decoration of the Casa de Pilatos in Seville. Nonetheless, non-religious sculpture played a relatively minor role until such 19th-century sculptors as Antonio Susillo.

Painting

As in sculpture, there were Sevillian and the Granadan schools of painting. The former has figured prominently in the history of Spanish art since the 15th century and includes such important artists as Zurbarán, Velázquez and Murillo, as well as theoreticians of art such as Francisco Pacheco. The Museum of Fine Arts of Seville and the Prado contain numerous representative works of the Sevillian school of painting.

A specific romantic genre known as costumbrismo andaluz depicts traditional and folkloric Andalusian subjects, such as bullfighting scenes, dogs, and scenes from Andalusia's history. Important artists in this genre include Manuel Barrón, José García Ramos, Gonzalo Bilbao and Julio Romero de Torres. The genre is well represented in the private Carmen Thyssen-Bornemisza Collection, part of which is on display at Madrid's Thyssen-Bornemisza Museum and Carmen Thyssen Museum in Málaga.

Málaga also has been and is an important artistic center. Its most illustrious representative was Pablo Picasso, one of the most influential artists of the 20th century. The city has a Museum and Natal House Foundation, dedicated to the painter.

Literature and philosophy

Andalusia plays a significant role in the history of Spanish-language literature, although not all of the important literature associated with Andalusia was written in Spanish. Before 1492, there was the literature written in Andalusian Arabic. Hispano-Arabic authors native to the region include Ibn Hazm, Ibn Zaydún, Ibn Tufail, Al-Mu'tamid, Ibn al-Khatib, Ibn al-Yayyab, and Ibn Zamrak or Andalusian Hebrew poets as Solomon ibn Gabirol. Ibn Quzman, of the 12th century, crafted poems in the colloquial Andalusian language.

In 1492 Antonio de Nebrija published his celebrated Gramática de la lengua castellana ("Grammar of the Castilian language"), the first such work for a modern European language. In 1528 Francisco Delicado wrote La lozana andaluza, a novel in the orbit of La Celestina, and in 1599 the Sevillian Mateo Alemán wrote the first part of Guzmán de Alfarache, the first picaresque novel with a known author.

The prominent humanist literary school of Seville included such writers as Juan de Mal Lara, Fernando de Herrera, Gutierre de Cetina, Luis Barahona de Soto, Juan de la Cueva, Gonzalo Argote de Molina, and Rodrigo Caro. The Córdoban Luis de Góngora was the greatest exponent of the culteranismo of Baroque poetry in the Siglo de Oro; indeed, the style is often referred to as Góngorismo.

Literary Romanticism in Spain had one of its great centers in Andalusia, with such authors as Ángel de Saavedra, 3rd Duke of Rivas, José Cadalso and Gustavo Adolfo Bécquer. Costumbrismo andaluz existed in literature as much as in visual art, with notable examples being the Escenas andaluzas of Serafín Estébanez Calderón and the works of Pedro Antonio de Alarcón.

Andalusian authors Ángel Ganivet, Manuel Gómez-Moreno, Manuel and Antonio Machado, and Francisco Villaespesa are all generally counted in the Generation of '98. Also of this generation were the Quintero brothers, dramatists who faithfully captured Andalusian dialects and idiosyncrasies. Also of note, 1956 Nobel Prize-winning poet Juan Ramón Jiménez was a native of Moguer, near Huelva.

A large portion of the avant-garde Generation of '27 who gathered at the Ateneo de Sevilla on the 300th anniversary of Góngora's death were Andalusians: Federico García Lorca, Luis Cernuda, Rafael Alberti, Manuel Altolaguirre, Emilio Prados, and 1977 Nobel laureate Vicente Aleixandre.

Certain Andalusian fictional characters have become universal archetypes: Prosper Mérimée's gypsy Carmen, P. D. Eastman's Perro, Pierre Beaumarchais's Fígaro, and Tirso de Molina's Don Juan.

Ballads, lullabies, street vendor's cries, nursery rhymes, and work songs are plentiful.

Among the philosophers native to the region can be counted Seneca, Avicebron, Maimonides, Averroes, Fernán Pérez de Oliva, Sebastián Fox Morcillo, Ángel Ganivet, Francisco Giner de los Ríos and María Zambrano.

Music of Andalusia

The music of Andalusia includes traditional and contemporary music, folk and composed music, and ranges from flamenco to rock. Conversely, certain metric, melodic and harmonic characteristics are considered Andalusian even when written or performed by musicians from elsewhere.

Flamenco, perhaps the most characteristically Andalusian genre of music and dance, originated in the 18th century, but is based in earlier forms from the region. The influence of the traditional music and dance of the Romani people or Gypsies is particularly clear. The genre embraces distinct vocal (cante flamenco), guitar (toque flamenco), and dance (baile flamenco) styles.

The Andalusian Statute of Autonomy reflects the cultural importance of flamenco in its Articles 37.1.18 and 68:

Fundamental in the history of Andalusian music are the composers Cristóbal de Morales, Francisco Guerrero, Francisco Correa de Arauxo, Manuel García, Manuel de Falla, Joaquín Turina, and Manuel Castillo, as well as one of the fathers of modern classical guitar, the guitarist Andrés Segovia. Mention should also be made of the great folk artists of the copla (music) and the cante hondo, such as Rocío Jurado, Lola Flores (La Faraona, "the pharaoh"), Juanito Valderrama and the revolutionary Camarón de la Isla.

Prominent Andalusian rock groups include Triana and Medina Azahara. The duo Los del Río from Dos Hermanas had international success with their "Macarena", including playing at a Super Bowl half-time show in the United States, where their song has also been used as campaign music by the Democratic Party. Other notables include the singer, songwriter, and poet Joaquín Sabina, Isabel Pantoja, Rosa López, who represented Spain at Eurovision in 2002, and David Bisbal.

In 2023, Seville will host the 24th Annual Latin Grammy Awards, making Seville the first city outside of the United States to host the Latin Grammy Awards.

Film

The portrayal of Andalusia in film is often reduced to archetypes: flamenco, bullfighting, Catholic pageantry, brigands, the property-rich and cash-poor señorito andaluz and emigrants. These images particularly predominated from the 1920s through the 1960s, and helped to consolidate a clichéd image of the region. In a very different vein, the province of Almería was the filming location for many Westerns, especially (but by no means exclusively) the Italian-directed Spaghetti Westerns. During the dictatorship of Francisco Franco, this was the extent of the film industry in Andalusia.

Nonetheless, Andalusian film has roots as far back as José Val del Omar in the pre-Franco years, and since the Spanish transition to democracy has brought forth numerous nationally and internationally respected directors: Antonio Cuadri (Heart of the Earth), Chus Gutiérrez (Poniente), Chiqui Carabante (Carlos Against the World), Alberto Rodríguez (7 Virgins), Benito Zambrano (Solas), and Antonio Banderas (Summer Rain).

Counting together feature films, documentaries, television programs, music videos etc., Andalusia has boomed from 37 projects shooting in 1999 to 1,054 in 2007, with the figure for 2007 including 19 feature films. Although feature films are the most prestigious, commercials and television are currently more economically important to the region.

The Filmoteca de Andalucía, headquartered in Córdoba, is a government-run entity in charge of the investigation, collection and diffusion of Andalusian cinematic heritage. Other important contributors to this last activity are such annual film festivals as the Málaga Spanish Film Festival, the most important festival dedicated exclusively to cinema made in Spain, the Seville European Film Festival (SEFF), the International Festival of Short Films—Almería in Short, the Huelva Festival of Latin American Film, the Atlantic Film Show in Cádiz, the Islantilla Festival of Film and Television and the African Film Festival of Tarifa.

Culture

Customs and society

Each sub-region in Andalusia has its own unique customs that represent a fusion of Catholicism and local folklore. Cities like Almería have been influenced historically by both Granada and Murcia in the use of traditional head coverings.  The sombrero de Labrador, a worker's hat made of black velvet, is a signature style of the region.

In Cádiz, traditional costumes with rural origins are worn at bullfights and at parties on the large estates. The tablao flamenco dance and the accompanying cante jondo vocal style originated in Andalusia and traditionally most often performed by the gypsy (Gitanos). One of the most distinctive cultural events in Andalusia is the Romería de El Rocío in May. It consists of a pilgrimage to the Hermitage of El Rocío in the countryside near Almonte, in honor of the Virgin of El Rocío, an image of the Virgin and Child. In recent times the Romería has attracted roughly a million pilgrims each year.

In Jaén, the saeta is a revered form of Spanish religious song, whose form and style has evolved over many centuries. Saetas evoke strong emotion and are sung most often during public processions. Verdiales, based upon the fandango, are a flamenco music style and song form originating in Almogia, near Málaga. For this reason, the Verdiales are sometimes known as Fandangos de Málaga. The region also has a rich musical tradition of flamenco songs, or palos called cartageneras. Seville celebrates Semana Santa, one of the better known religious events within Spain. During the festival, religious fraternities dress as penitents and carry large floats of lifelike wooden sculptures representing scenes of the Passion, and images of the Virgin Mary. Sevillanas, a type of old folk music sung and written in Seville and still very popular, are performed in fairs and festivals, along with an associated dance for the music, the Baile por sevillanas. All the different regions of Andalusia have developed their own distinctive customs, but all share a connectedness to Catholicism as developed during baroque Spain society.

Andalusian Spanish

Andalusian Spanish is one of the most widely spoken forms of Spanish in Spain, and because of emigration patterns was very influential on American Spanish. Rather than a single dialect, it is really a range of dialects sharing some common features; among these is
the retention of more Arabic words than elsewhere in Spain, as well as some phonological differences compared with Standard Spanish. The isoglosses that mark the borders of Andalusian Spanish overlap to form a network of divergent boundaries, so there is no clear border for the linguistic region. A fringe movement promoting an Andalusian language independent from Spanish exists.

Religion

The territory now known as Andalusia fell within the sphere of influence of ancient Mediterranean mythological beliefs. Phoenician colonization brought the cults of Baal and Melqart; the latter lasted into Roman times as Hercules, mythical founder of both Cádiz and Seville. The Islote de Sancti Petri held the supposed tomb of Hercules, with representations of his Twelve labors; the region was the traditional site of the tenth labor, obtaining the cattle of the monster Geryon. Traditionally, the Pillars of Hercules flank the Strait of Gibraltar. Clearly, the European pillar is the Rock of Gibraltar; the African pillar was presumably either Monte Hacho in Ceuta or Jebel Musa in Morocco. The Roman road that led from Cádiz to Rome was known by several names, one of them being Via Herculea, Hercules route returning from his tenth labor. The present coat of arms of Andalusia shows Hercules between two lions, with two pillars behind these figures.

Roman Catholicism is, by far, the largest religion in Andalusia. In 2012, the proportion of Andalusians that identify themselves as Roman Catholic was 78.8%. The principal characteristic of the local popular form of Catholicism is devotion to the Virgin Mary; Andalusia is sometimes known as la tierra de María Santísima ("the land of Most Holy Mary"). Also characteristic are the processions during Holy Week, in which thousands of penitents (known as nazarenos) sing saetas. Andalusia is the site of such pilgrim destinations as the Santuario de Nuestra Señora de la Cabeza in Andújar and the Hermitage of El Rocío in Almonte.

Bullfighting

While some trace the lineage of the Spanish Fighting Bull back to Roman times, today's fighting bulls in the Iberian peninsula and in the former Spanish Empire trace back to Andalusia in the 15th and 16th centuries. Andalusia remains a center of bull-rearing and bullfighting: its 227 fincas de ganado where fighting bulls are raised cover . In the year 2000, Andalusia's roughly 100 bullrings hosted 1,139 corridas.

The oldest bullring still in use in Spain is the neoclassical Plaza de toros in Ronda, built in 1784. The Andalusian Autonomous Government sponsors the Rutas de Andalucía taurina, a touristic route through the region centered on bullfighting.

Festivals

The Andalusian festivals provide a showcase for popular arts and traditional costume. Among the most famous of these are the Seville Fair or Feria de Abril in Seville, now echoed by smaller fairs in Madrid and Barcelona, both of which have many Andalusian immigrants; the Feria de Agosto in Málaga; the Feria de Jerez or Feria del Caballo in Jerez; the Festival of Corpus Christi in Granada; the Feria de Nuestra Señora de la Salud in Córdoba; the Columbian Festivals (Fiestas Colombinas) in Huelva; the Feria de la Virgen del Mar in Almería; and the Feria de San Lucas in Jaén, among many others.

Festivals of a religious nature are a deep Andalusian tradition and are met with great popular fervor. There are numerous major festivals during Holy Week. An annual pilgrimage brings a million visitors to the Hermitage of El Rocío in Almonte (population 16,914 in 2008); similarly large crowds visit the Santuario de Nuestra Señora de la Cabeza in Andújar every April.

Other important festivals are the Carnival of Cádiz and the Fiesta de las Cruces or Cruz de mayo in Granada and Córdoba; in Córdoba this is combined with a competition for among the patios (courtyards) of the city.

Andalusia hosts an annual festival for the dance of flamenco in the summer-time.

Cuisine

The Andalusian diet varies, especially between the coast and the interior, but in general is a Mediterranean diet based on olive oil, cereals, legumes, vegetables, fish, dried fruits and nuts, and meat; there is also a great tradition of drinking wine.

Fried fish—pescaíto frito—and seafood are common on the coast and also eaten well into the interior under coastal influence. Atlantic bluefin tuna (Thunnus thynnus) from the Almadraba areas of the Gulf of Cádiz, prawns from Sanlúcar de Barrameda (known as langostino de Sanlúcar), and deepwater rose shrimp from Huelva are all highly prized. Fishing for the transparent goby or chanquete (Aphia minuta), a once-popular small fish from Málaga, is now banned because the techniques used to catch them trap too many immature fish of other species.

The mountainous regions of the Sierra Morena and Sierra Nevada produce cured hams, notably including jamón serrano and jamón ibérico. These come from two different types of pig, (jamón serrano from white pigs, the more expensive jamón ibérico from the Black Iberian pig). There are several denominaciones de origen, each with its own specifications including in just which microclimate region ham of a particular denomination must be cured. Plato alpujarreño is another mountain specialty, a dish combining ham, sausage, sometimes other pork, egg, potatoes, and olive oil.

Confectionery is popular in Andalusia. Almonds and honey are common ingredients.

Cereal-based dishes include migas de harina in eastern Andalusia (a similar dish to couscous rather than the fried breadcrumb based migas elsewhere in Spain) and a sweeter, more aromatic porridge called poleá in western Andalusia.
Hot and cold soups based in olive oil, garlic, bread, tomato and peppers include gazpacho, salmorejo, porra antequerana, ajo caliente, sopa campera, or—using almonds instead of tomato—ajoblanco.

Wine has a privileged place at the Andalusian table. Andalusian wines are known worldwide, especially fortified wines such as sherry (jerez), aged in soleras. These are enormously varied; for example, dry sherry may be the very distinct fino, manzanilla, amontillado, oloroso, or Palo Cortado and each of these varieties can each be sweetened with Pedro Ximénez or Moscatel to produce a different variety of sweet sherry. Besides sherry, Andalucía has five other denominaciones de origen for wine: D.O. Condado de Huelva, D.O. Manzanilla-Sanlúcar de Barrameda, D.O. Málaga, D.O. Montilla-Moriles, and D.O. Sierras de Málaga. Most Andalusian wine comes from one of these regions, but there are other historic wines without a Protected Geographical Status, for example Tintilla de Rota, Pajarete, Moscatel de Chipiona and Mosto de Umbrete.

Andalusia also produces D.O. vinegar and brandy: D.O. Vinagre de Jerez and D.O. Brandy de Jerez.

Other traditions
The traditional dress of 18th-century Andalusia was strongly influenced by  within the context of casticismo (purism, traditionalism, authenticity). The archetype of the majo and maja was that of a bold, pure Spaniard from a lower-class background, somewhat flamboyant in his or her style of dress. This emulation of lower-class dress also extended to imitating the clothes of brigands and Romani ("Gypsy") women.

The Museum of Arts and Traditions of Sevilla  has collected representative samples of a great deal of the history of Andalusian dress, including examples of such notable types of hat as the sombrero cordobés, sombrero calañés, sombrero de catite and the pavero, as well as the traje corto and traje de flamenca.

Andalusia has a great artisan tradition in tile, leather (see Shell cordovan), weaving (especially of the heavy jarapa cloth), marquetry, and ceramics (especially in Jaén, Granada, and Almería), lace (especially Granada and Huelva), embroidery (in Andévalo), ironwork, woodworking, and basketry in wicker, many of these traditions a heritage of the long period of Muslim rule.

Andalusia is also known for its dogs, particularly the Andalusian Hound, which was originally bred in the region. Dogs, not just andalusian hounds, are very popular in the region.

Andalusian equestrianism, institutionalized in the Royal Andalusian School of Equestrian Art is known well beyond the borders of Spain. The Andalusian horse is strongly built, compact yet elegant, distinguished in the area of dressage and show jumping, and is also an excellent horse for driving. They are known for their elegant "dancing" gait.

Sports

Team sports

In Andalusia, as throughout Spain, football is the predominant sport. Introduced to Spain by British men who worked in mining for Rio Tinto in the province of Huelva, the sport soon became popular with the local population. As Spain's oldest existing football club, Recreativo de Huelva, founded 1889, is known as El Decano ("the Dean").

For the 2022–23 season, 4 Andalusian clubs compete in Spain's First Division La Liga: Cádiz CF, Real Betis, and Sevilla FC, and UD Almería. Betis won La Liga in 1934–35 and Sevilla in the 1945–46 season. The other Andalusian teams, Granada CF and Málaga CF play in the Segunda División, Córdoba CF play in the Primera Federación, whilst Recreativo de Huelva, participate in the Segunda Federación, and Marbella FC and Real Jaén participate in the Tercera División. 

The Andalusia autonomous football team is not in any league, and plays only friendly matches. In recent years, they have played mostly during the Christmas break of the football leagues. They play mostly against national teams from other countries, but would not be eligible for international league play, where Spain is represented by a single national team.

In recent decades, basketball has become increasingly popular, with CB Málaga, also known as Unicaja Málaga who have won the Liga ACB in 2007 and the Korać Cup in 2001 and usually play the Euroleague, CB Sevilla (Banca Cívica) and CB Granada competing at the top level in the Liga ACB.

Unlike basketball, handball has never really taken off in Andalusia. There is one Andalusian team in the Liga Asobal, Spain's premier handball league: BM Puente Genil, playing in the province of Córdoba.

Andalusia's strongest showing in sports has been in table tennis. There are two professional teams: Cajasur Priego TM and Caja Granada TM, the latter being Spain's leading table tennis team, with more than 20 league championships in nearly consecutive years and 14 consecutive Copas del Rey, dominating the Liga ENEBÉ. Cajasur is also one of the league's leading teams.

Olympics

220 Andalusian athletes have competed in a total of 16 summer or winter Olympic Games. The first was Leopoldo Sainz de la Maza, part of the silver medal-winning polo team at the 1920 Summer Olympics in Antwerp, Belgium.

In all, Andalusians have won six gold medals, 11 silver, and two bronze. Winners of multiple medals include the Córdoban boxer Rafael Lozano (bronze in the 1996 Summer Olympics at Atlanta, Georgia, US, and silver in the 2000 Summer Olympics in Sydney, Australia); sailor Theresa Zabell, Malagueña by adoption (gold medals at Barcelona in 1992 and Atlanta in 1996). Other notable winners have been Granadan tennis player Manuel Orantes (silver in the men's singles of the demonstration tournament in Mexico City in 1968), Jerezano riders Ignacio Rambla and Rafael Soto (silver in dressage in Athens in 2004) and the racewalker Paquillo Fernández from Guadix (silver in Athens in 2004).

The largest number of Olympic appearances were by the Malagueña swimmer María Peláez (five appearances), the Granadan skier María José Rienda (four), the Sevillian rider Luis Astolfi (four), and the Sevillian rower Fernando Climent (four, including a silver at Los Angeles, California, US, in 1984.

Seville has been a pre-candidate to host the Summer Olympics in two occasions, 2004 and 2008, and Granada has been a pre-candidate to host the winter Olympics; neither has ever succeeded in its candidature. The ski resort of Sierra Nevada, near Granada, has however hosted the 1996 Alpine World Ski Championships, and Granada hosted the 2015 Winter Universiade.

Other sports
Other sporting events in Andalusia include surfing, kitesurfing and windsurfing competitions at Tarifa, various golf tournaments at courses along the coast, and horse racing and polo at several locations in the interior. Andalusia hosted the 1999 World Championships in Athletics (Seville), the 2005 Mediterranean Games (Almería) and the FIS Alpine World Ski Championships 1996 (Granada), among other major events. There is also the annual Vuelta a Andalucía bicycle road race and the Linares chess tournament. The Circuito de Jerez, located near Jerez de la Frontera, hosts the Spanish motorcycle Grand Prix.

Twinning and covenants
Andalusia has had a sister region relationship with Buenos Aires (Argentina), since 2001; and with Córdoba (Argentina). Also Andalusia has a collaboration agreement with Guerrero (Mexico).

See also

 Andalusian people
 Andalusian nationalism
 Azulejo
 List of Andalusians
 List of the oldest mosques
 Roman Bética Route
 San Juan De Los Terreros
 White Towns of Andalusia
 Yeseria

References

External links

 Official site – Junta de Andalucia
 Andalucia Tourism Site
 Andalucia page at the guardian

 
Autonomous communities of Spain
NUTS 2 statistical regions of the European Union
States and territories established in 1981
States and territories established in 2007